The Kyiv Municipal Academy of Variety and Circus Arts is a Ukrainian institution of higher education, training stage and circus performers.

Founded as a Republic-wide studio in 1961 in the Ukrainian SSR, it became a state school, and later the Kyiv State College of Circus and Variety Arts.  In 2008 it gained the status of a Municipal Academy.
 
The Academy has three faculty divisions comprising 190 instructors: the Circus Art Faculty, the Musical Art Faculty, and the Theatrical Art Faculty.

Notable alumni
 Andriy Danylko, comedian and singer, Honored Artist of Ukraine, known for the character Verka Serduchka

References

External links
Official site 
Official YouTube channel

Universities and colleges in Kyiv
Educational institutions established in 1961